Extreme music may refer to any of the following musical categories, or their overlap:

 Extreme metal, a group of transgressive heavy metal subgenres
 Hardcore punk, and other punk rock genres characterized by speed and aggression
 Experimental music, which radically challenges existing musical conventions 
 Noise music, which blurs the distinction between musical and non-musical sound

See also 
 Extreme Music, a music production company
 Extreme (disambiguation)
 Extreme Records, a record label